Villains and Vigilantes is a Role-playing game in the superhero genre. It was an early rpg, originally published in 1979 and has currently been through two editions.  A revision to the second edition, known as version 2.1, has been published by Monkey House Games, though some controversy surrounds this edition.

First Edition

Second Edition 

Lists of books
Lists about role-playing games
Villains and Vigilantes